Auriporia aurea is a species of poroid fungus. It was first described scientifically by Charles Horton Peck in 1890 as Poria aurea. Leif Ryvarden transferred it to the new genus Auriporia, in which it is the type species.

References

Fomitopsidaceae
Taxa named by Charles Horton Peck
Fungi described in 1890
Fungi of Europe
Fungi of North America